Mierzyn may refer to the following places:
Mierzyn, Greater Poland Voivodeship (west-central Poland)
Mierzyn, Łódź Voivodeship (central Poland)
Mierzyn, Świętokrzyskie Voivodeship (south-central Poland)
Mierzyn, Warmian-Masurian Voivodeship (north Poland)
Mierzyn, Białogard County in West Pomeranian Voivodeship (north-west Poland)
Mierzyn, Gryfice County in West Pomeranian Voivodeship (north-west Poland)
Mierzyn, Police County in West Pomeranian Voivodeship (north-west Poland)